Michael Mesrobian (1947 – July 2, 2009), better known by the pen name of Grant Michaels, was an American writer of mystery novels. He published six novels with St. Martin's Press in the 1990s, centering on Stan Kraychik, a gay hairdresser turned amateur detective. All six novels were shortlisted Lambda Literary Award finalists in the Gay Mystery category.

Works
A Body to Dye For (1990)
Love You to Death (1992)
Dead on Your Feet (1993)
Mask for a Diva (1994)
Time to Check Out (1996)
Dead as a Doornail (1998)

References

1947 births
2009 deaths
20th-century American novelists
American male novelists
American mystery writers
African-American short story writers
American short story writers
American gay writers
Novelists from Massachusetts
People from Lawrence, Massachusetts
20th-century American male writers
African-American novelists
20th-century African-American writers
21st-century African-American people
African-American male writers